Tesla Roadster may refer to:
 Tesla Roadster (first generation), an electric sports car produced by Tesla Motors between 2008‒2012
 Elon Musk's Tesla Roadster, a first generation Tesla Roadster that was launched into space in February 2018
 Tesla Roadster (second generation), a sports car in development by Tesla, Inc.